Hoon, also spelled Hun, is a single-syllable masculine Korean given name, as well as a morpheme in many other Korean given names. The meaning differs based on the hanja with which the name is written.

Hanja
There are 12 hanja with this reading, and two variant forms, on the South Korean government's official list of hanja which may be used in given names; they are:

 (가르칠 훈 garuchil hun): "to teach"
 (공 훈 gong hun): "merit"
 (variant of above)
 (김 쐴 훈 gim ssoel hun): "to dry gim"
 (불길 훈 bulgil hun): "blaze"
 (향풀 훈 hyangpul hun): "basil"
 (질나발 훈 jilnabal hun): a Korean wind instrument
 (variant of above)
 (연기낄 훈 yeongikkil hun): "smoke"
 (금빛 투색할 훈 geumbit tusaekhal hun): "faded gold colour"
 (무리 훈 muri hun): "faint"
 (분홍빛 훈 bunhongbit hun): "afterglow"
: "weld"
 (향풀 훈 hyangpul hun): "basil"

People
People with the single-syllable given name Hoon include:
Sim Hun (born Sim Daeseop, 1901–1936), Korean novelist of the Japanese colonial period
Isao Harimoto (born Jang Hun, 1940), ethnic Korean baseball player in Japan
Kim Hoon (born 1948), South Korean novelist
Suh Hoon (born 1954), South Korean intelligence officer
Chung Hoon (born 1969), South Korean judo practitioner
Lee Hoon (actor) (born 1973), South Korean actor
Hoon Lee (born 1973), American television, theatre, and voice actor of Korean descent
Jang Hoon (born 1975), South Korean film director
Sung Hoon (singer) (born 1980), South Korean singer, member of R&B group Brown Eyed Soul
Jung Hoon (born 1985), South Korean football player
Lee Hun (footballer) (born 1986), South Korean football player

Fictional characters with this name include:
Jhun Hoon, character in 1990s and 2000s video game series The King of Fighters

As name element
From the 1960s to the 1980s, a number of given names containing this morpheme were among the top ten most popular names for newborn boys in South Korea:
Ji-hoon, the only name among these which has remained in the top ten during the 1990s and 2000s
Jung-hoon (10th place in 1960, 1st place in 1970, 3rd place in 1980)
Sang-hoon (9th place in 1960 and 1970)
Sung-hoon (5th place in 1970, 6th place in 1980)

Given names containing this morpheme include:

Byung-hoon
Chang-hoon
Do-hun
Dong-hoon
Ji-hoon
Jong-hoon
Jung-hoon
Kwang-hoon
Myung-hoon
Sang-hoon
Seung-hoon
Se-hun
Sung-hoon
Young-hoon

See also
List of Korean given names

References

Korean masculine given names